It's all in the game was a Dutch TV game show for students of the NCRV which ran from 1985 till 1988. The show centered on home computer games. Several of the games were developed by Radarsoft.

Presenters
Hans Brian (1985-1987)
Henk Mouwe (1987-1988)

Commentator
Herman Kuiphof (1986-1987)

Directors
René Stokvis (1985,1987)
John van de Rest (1986)
Fred Hilberdink (1988)

External links
 It's all in the game on the Beeld en Geluid wiki

1985 Dutch television series debuts
1988 Dutch television series endings
Dutch game shows